Pedro Ocharte was one of the first printers in the Americas, active from 1563 to 1592.

Life and career 
Originally from Rouen in France, Ocharte came to the City of Mexico in New Spain around 1549. He married Maria de Figueroa, the daughter of printer Juan Pablos, and in 1563 took over the operation of Pablos's press. In 1572, Ocharte was imprisoned by the Inquisition, as one of his prints was considered heretical.  Ocharte died around 1592.

Ocharte's son Melchior Ocharte was also a printer.

Books printed by Pedro Ocharte

References

See also
Antonio de Espinosa

French printers
People of New Spain
Businesspeople from Mexico City
Year of birth missing
Year of death missing
16th-century printers
Businesspeople from Rouen
16th-century French businesspeople
French emigrants to Mexico
16th-century Spanish businesspeople